Gladson is a given name. Notable people with the name include:

Gladson Awako (born 1990), Ghanaian footballer
Gládson Barbosa (born 1979), Brazilian steeplechase runner
Gladson Cameli (born 1978), Brazilian politician
Gladson do Nascimento (born 1986), Brazilian footballer
Gladson Dungdung, Indian activist and writer